Richard Spencer (born 16 July 1955) is a Cuban former high jumper who competed in the 1976 Summer Olympics.

References

1955 births
Living people
Cuban male high jumpers
Pan American Games competitors for Cuba
Athletes (track and field) at the 1975 Pan American Games
Athletes (track and field) at the 1979 Pan American Games
Olympic athletes of Cuba
Athletes (track and field) at the 1976 Summer Olympics
Central American and Caribbean Games gold medalists for Cuba
Competitors at the 1974 Central American and Caribbean Games
Competitors at the 1978 Central American and Caribbean Games
Central American and Caribbean Games medalists in athletics
20th-century Cuban people
21st-century Cuban people